William James McGreevy (11 November 1899 – 1981) was an English professional footballer who played as an inside forward. He made three appearances in the Football League for Nelson in the 1921–22 season.

References

People from Fleetwood
English footballers
Association football inside forwards
Nelson F.C. players
English Football League players
1899 births
1981 deaths